Gerdes , or Geerdes, is a surname of German origin. It is a patronymic name, i.e. it comes from "son of Gerhard". When around 1800 the Prussian government under French occupation decided to fix the surnames, the contemporary "son of Gerhard" had to keep his name. In Ostfriesland, the law was ignored until at least 1811.

Origin

Ge(e)rdes is a patronymic derived from the name "Gerd", short for Gerard, meaning "hard spear", or from the Norse goddess Gerd (meaning "Gerd's protection"), wife of Freyr and protectress of the home yard and garden, from which she also derives her name as a personification of the garden/yard.

People
 Herbert Gerdes, German director
 Kristina Geerdes, German model
 Hans-Peter Geerdes (born 1964), lead singer of the German band Scooter
Eckhard Gerdes (born 1959), American author
 Eduard Gerdes (1821–1898), Dutch lyric writer and author
 Michael Gerdes (born 1960), German politician
 Roswitha Gerdes (born 1961), German middle-distance runner

External links
 Distribution in the US
 Distribution in Germany (in numbers)
 Distribution in Germany (relative to population)
 Genealogical research on Gerdes

References

Patronymic surnames